HMS Ranelagh was a three-decker 80-gun third-rate ship of the line of the Royal Navy, launched at Deptford Dockyard on 25 June 1697. She took part in a number of actions during the War of the Spanish Succession, including the Battle of Vigo in 1702 and the Battle of Vélez-Málaga in 1704.

On 20 August 1723 she was ordered to be taken to pieces and rebuilt according to the 1719 Establishment at Woolwich. She was renamed HMS Princess Caroline in 1728 (while rebuilding). She was relaunched on 15 March 1731.

Princess Caroline was Admiral Edward Vernon's flagship at the Battle of Cartagena de Indias during his second Spanish Caribbean campaign, in the War of Jenkins' Ear.  George Washington's half-brother, Lawrence Washington, served on Princess Caroline as a Captain of the Marines in 1741, and named his estate Mount Vernon in honour of his commander.

The Princess Caroline continued in service until 1764, when she was broken up.

Notes

References

Lavery, Brian (2003) The Ship of the Line - Volume 1: The development of the battlefleet 1650-1850. Conway Maritime Press. .

Ships of the line of the Royal Navy
1690s ships